Gabriel Roth may refer to:
 Gabriel Roth (musician), American musician and producer
 Gabriel Roth (footballer) (born 1979), Argentine association football player
 Gabriel Roth (economist), writer on Transport economics
 Gabriel Roth (filmmaker) (born 1974), brother and sometime collaborator of Eli Roth

Similar spellings
 Gabriele Roth (born 1967) German hurdler
 Gabrielle Roth (1941–2012), American dancer